Paul André Beaulieu is a Canadian former diplomat. He was appointed Chargé d'Affaires a.i. to Lebanon then succeeded as Ambassador Extraordinary and Plenipotentiary to Lebanon. He was later appointed as Ambassador Extraordinary and Plenipotentiary to Iraq then to Brazil. He was next appointed as Ambassador and Permanent Representative to the United Nations in New York then as Ambassador Extraordinary and Plenipotentiary to France and then to Portugal.

External links 
 Foreign Affairs and International Trade Canada Complete List of Posts

Year of birth missing (living people)
Living people
Ambassadors of Canada to France
Ambassadors of Canada to Brazil
Ambassadors of Canada to Lebanon
Ambassadors of Canada to Iraq
Ambassadors of Canada to Portugal
Permanent Representatives of Canada to the United Nations